Makovo (Manovo, Masovo) is a village in the mountains of the municipality of Novaci, in the Mariovo region of North Macedonia. It used to be part of the former municipality of Staravina.

Demographics
According to the 2002 census, the village had a total of 71 inhabitants. Ethnic groups in the village include:

Macedonians 71

References

Villages in Novaci Municipality